AM 50 is a Czech automatically launched assault bridge used by combat engineers for crossing narrow obstacles such as rivers, canals, and ditches.

The AM 50 was developed for the Czechoslovak Army in the late 1960s. Today it is in use in the Czech Republic, Slovakia, India and Pakistan.

See also
 Armoured vehicle-launched bridge
 Bailey bridge

References

Military bridging equipment
Armoured vehicle-launched bridges
Armoured fighting vehicles of Czechoslovakia
Year of introduction missing